Wang Xiaolong (born 11 March 1986) is a Chinese footballer who currently plays for Chengdu Better City in the China League One.

Club career
Wang Xiaolong would play for Shandong Luneng's youth team before moving to the senior team and would eventually earn his senior team debut on 29 March 2006 in a game against Shenzhen Kingway. He would later score his first senior goal against Liaoning Hongyun on 27 September 2008 in a 4-2 victory. With Shandong, he would twice win the league and the Chinese FA Cup, however he was unable to establish himself as a first choice player within the team and at the end of the 2009 season he was allowed to leave the club.

With the chance to return to his hometown and join reigning champions Beijing Guoan, Wang Xiaolong would make the switch from Shandong to Beijing at the beginning of the 2010 league season with teammate Wu Hao in a package deal.
On 18 February 2014, Wang transferred to fellow Chinese Super League side Guangzhou R&F. He made his debut for the club in a 1-1 draw against Tianjin Teda on 9 March 2014. He scored his first two goals for the club on 31 July 2014 in a 5-1 win against Liaoning Whowin.

On 21 January 2017, Wang moved to Chinese Super League newcomer Tianjin Quanjian.

International career
In December 2006, Wang would be called up to the Chinese under-23 national team in preparation for the 2008 Summer Olympics and would play in several official and unofficial friendlies including a match where he scored a goal against Bayern Munich on 13 January 2008. Wang would not go to the 2008 Summer Olympics, however, after he established himself at Beijing he would be promoted to the senior team on 3 June 2012 when he played against Spain in a 1-0 defeat.

Career statistics
Statistics accurate as of match played 31 December 2020.

Honours

Club
Shandong Luneng
Chinese Super League: 2006, 2008
Chinese FA Cup: 2006

References

External links
 
 
Player profile at Sina.com
Player stats at Sohu.com

Player profile at Shandong Luneng website
Player profile at Great Wall Cup website

1986 births
Living people
Chinese footballers
Footballers from Beijing
Shandong Taishan F.C. players
Beijing Guoan F.C. players
Guangzhou City F.C. players
Tianjin Tianhai F.C. players
Chengdu Better City F.C. players
Chinese Super League players
China League One players
Association football wingers
China international footballers